São Vicente is a Portuguese freguesia ("civil parish"), located in the municipality of Braga. The population in 2011 was 13,236, in an area of 2.55 km².
In São Vicente is located the Faculty of Philosophy part of Catholic University of Portugal, the Escola Secundária Sá de Miranda and the Colégio D. Diogo de Sousa.

Main sights

St Vincent's Church
Carmo Church

References

Freguesias of Braga